Multivariate cryptography is the generic term for asymmetric cryptographic primitives based on multivariate polynomials over a finite field . In certain cases those polynomials could be defined over both a ground  and an extension field. If the polynomials have the degree two, we talk about multivariate quadratics. Solving systems of multivariate polynomial equations is proven to be NP-complete.  That's why those schemes are often considered to be good candidates for post-quantum cryptography. Multivariate cryptography has been very productive in terms of design and cryptanalysis. Overall, the situation is now more stable and the strongest schemes have withstood the test of time. It is commonly admitted that Multivariate cryptography turned out to be more successful as an approach to build signature schemes  primarily because multivariate schemes provide the shortest signature among post-quantum algorithms.

History 
 presented their  so-called C* scheme  at the Eurocrypt conference. In later work, the "Hidden Monomial Cryptosystems" was developed by  Jacques Patarin. It is based on a ground and an extension field. "Hidden Field Equations" (HFE), developed by Patarin in 1996, remains a popular multivariate scheme today [P96]. The security of HFE has been thoroughly investigated, beginning with a direct Gröbner basis attack [FJ03, GJS06], key-recovery attacks  [BFP13], and more. The plain version of HFE is considered to be practically broken, in the sense that secure parameters lead to an impractical scheme. However, some simple variants of HFE, such as the minus variant and the vinegar variant allow one to strengthen the basic HFE against all known attacks. 
    
In addition to HFE, Patarin developed other schemes. In 1997 he presented “Balanced Oil & Vinegar” and in 1999 “Unbalanced Oil and Vinegar”, in cooperation with Aviad Kipnis and Louis Goubin .

Construction
Multivariate Quadratics involves a public and a private key. The private key consists of two affine transformations, S and T, and an easy to invert quadratic map . We denote the  matrix of the affine endomorphisms
In other words,
  and
 .
The triple  is the private key, also known as the trapdoor. The public key is the composition  which is by assumption hard to invert without the knowledge of the trapdoor.

Signature
Signatures are generated using the private key and are verified using the public key as follows. The message is hashed to a vector in  via a known hash function. The signature is 
.

The receiver of the signed document must have the public key P in possession. He computes the hash  and checks that the signature  fulfils .

Applications

 Unbalanced Oil and Vinegar
 Hidden Field Equations
 SFLASH by NESSIE
 Rainbow
 TTS
 QUARTZ
 QUAD (cipher)
 Four multivariate cryptography signature schemes (GeMMS, LUOV, Rainbow and MQDSS) have made their way into the 2nd round of the NIST post-quantum competition: see slide 12 of the report.

References

 [BFP13] L. Bettale,  Jean-Charles Faugère, and  L. Perret, Cryptanalysis of HFE, Multi-HFE and Variants for Odd and Even Characteristic. DCC'13
 [FJ03] Jean-Charles Faugère and  A. Joux, Algebraic Cryptanalysis of Hidden Field Equation (HFE) Cryptosystems Using Gröbner Bases. CRYPTO'03
 [GJS06] L. Granboulan, Antoine Joux, J. Stern: Inverting HFE Is Quasipolynomial. CRYPTO'06.
 
 
 
 
 [P96] Jacques Patarin, Hidden Field Equations (HFE) and Isomorphisms of Polynomials (IP): two new Families of Asymmetric Algorithms (extended version); Eurocrypt '96
 Christopher Wolf and Bart Preneel, Taxonomy of Public Key Schemes based on the problem of Multivariate Quadratic equations; Current Version: 2005-12-15
An Braeken, Christopher Wolf, and Bart Preneel, A Study of the Security of Unbalanced Oil and Vinegar Signature Schemes, Current Version: 2005-08-06
Jintai Ding, Research Project: Cryptanalysis on Rainbow and TTS multivariate public key signature scheme
Jacques Patarin, Nicolas Courtois, Louis Goubin, SFLASH, a fast asymmetric signature scheme for low-cost smartcards. Primitive specification and supporting documentation.
Bo-Yin Yang, Chen-Mou Cheng, Bor-Rong Chen, and Jiun-Ming Chen, Implementing Minimized Multivariate PKC on Low-Resource Embedded Systems, 2006
Bo-Yin Yang, Jiun-Ming Chen, and Yen-Hung Chen, TTS: High-Speed Signatures on a Low-Cost Smart Card, 2004
Nicolas T. Courtois, Short Signatures, Provable Security, Generic Attacks and Computational Security of Multivariate Polynomial Schemes such as HFE, Quartz and Sflash, 2005
Alfred J. Menezes, Paul C. van Oorschot, and Scott A. Vanstone, Handbook of Applied Cryptography, 1997

External links
  The HFE public key encryption and signature
  HFEBoost

 
Post-quantum cryptography